Thomas Slinger, known professionally as Gemini, is an english producer, songwriter, vocalist and DJ, active between 2010 and 2016.

Born and raised in Leicester, he soon discovered a talent for the production of electronic dance music (particularly dubstep) and released his first EP, Blue, on 14 February 2011 while studying at Leeds University.  He is co-owner of Inspected Records and, as of September 2016, has released four EPs (Blue, Graduation, Fire Inside, and Mercury) with the label. He has featured heavily on BBC Radio 1's night time shows, especially Zane Lowe, Nick Grimshaw and Annie Mac. He appeared in Radio 1's Festival 2011 and also produced a minimix for BBC Radio 1Xtra's MistaJam. 

On 2 April 2013, he launched his Lonely Hearts series with the first edition of Fire Inside including vocals by Greta Svabo Bech and himself. He self-published the releases of this series as limited editions.

After a hiatus of over three years, Gemini released a single on 5 February 2016, "Time To Share".

Discography

Lonely Hearts series

Remixes

References

Living people
1990 births
English pop singers
English songwriters
English DJs
People from Leicester
Electronic musicians
Dubstep musicians
Musicians from Leicestershire
Peacefrog Records artists